The U.S. state of Nevada has a quite limited potential capacity for onshore wind power generation, ranking 29th among the states. The NREL estimates that the potential for 7.2 GW of wind generation capacity exists in Nevada, which could generate 17,709 GW·h per year (roughly 60% of the state's electric demand).

As of 2016 Nevada has just 152 MW installed in one farm, the Spring Valley Wind project, which commenced operation in 2012. Wind power was responsible for 0.9% of in-state electricity produced in 2016.

See also

Solar power in Nevada
Wind power in the United States
Renewable energy in the United States

References

External links

WindGenerations a program to develop wind power in Nevada